Eilema aurora is a moth of the subfamily Arctiinae first described by Walter Rothschild in 1916. It is found in New Guinea.

References

aurora